Kim Man-jung (Hangul: 김만중, Hanja: 金萬重; 6 March 1637 – 14 June 1692) was a Korean novelist and politician. He was one of the eminent Neo-Confucian scholars of the Joseon period.

Life and work
A member of the yangban class, Kim passed the state civil service examination and rose through the official ranks to become an academic counselor and minister during the reign of King Sukjong. He was exiled twice for involvement in the political factionalism of the time.

As a man of letters, his most renowned works were the novels "Record of Lady Sa's Trip to the South" and "The Cloud Dream of the Nine". The former is a novel about family affairs set in China, but it is also a satirical depiction of the political reality of his day, and in particular a rebuke of King Sukjong. The latter is one of the most prominent novels of traditional Korea. It is said that Kim wrote The Cloud Dream of the Nine during his second exile. It is an ideal novel dealing with the affairs of life and is centered on the travails of the hero. It has a highly Buddhist overtone, with an emphasis on the transience of worldly glory and pleasure.

Family 
 Father 
 Kim Ik-gyeom (김익겸, 金益兼) (1614 – 16 February 1637)
 Mother 
 Lady Yun of the Haepyeong Yun clan (해평 윤씨, 海平 尹氏) (1617 – 1689)
 Wife and children
 Lady Yi of the Yeonan Yi clan (연안 이씨)
 Daughter: Lady Kim of the Gwangsan Kim clan (광산 김씨, 光山 金氏)
 Son-in-law: Yi Yi-myeong of the Jeonju Yi clan (이이명 전주 이씨, 李頤命 全州 李氏) (2 February 1658 – 13 June 1722)
 Son: Kim Jin-hwa (김진화, 金鎭華)

See also 
 Kim Jang-saeng
 Queen Ingyeong
 Kim Jip
 Kim Ik-hun

References 

1637 births
1692 deaths
Korean novelists
Korean politicians
Korean Confucianists
Gwangsan Kim clan
17th-century Korean poets